Peter Benedict Holmes (born March 30, 1979) is an American comedian, actor, writer, producer, and podcaster. Musings on spirituality and religion are frequent themes in his works.

Holmes gained recognition in the early 2010s as a stand-up comic, during which he launched his long-running podcast You Made It Weird (2011–present), released his first comedy special, and worked as an actor and television writer. Subsequently, he began his own late-night talk show The Pete Holmes Show (2013–2014), which ran on TBS for two seasons in the time-slot after Conan, a frequent champion of his work. During the decade, he released four comedy specials: Impregnated with Wonder (2011), Nice Try, The Devil (2013), Faces and Sounds (2016), and Dirty Clean (2018).

Holmes is most widely known for starring and creating the semi-autobiographical scripted comedy series Crashing, which aired on HBO for three seasons (2017–2019). He has also worked as a voice actor and most recently starred in the 2022 CBS sitcom How We Roll.

Early life
Peter Benedict Holmes was born in Boston on March 30, 1979, the son of a Lithuanian refugee mother and an American father of Irish descent. He has a brother who composes music under the name Dr. Holmes. He grew up in Lexington, Massachusetts, where he graduated from Lexington High School. Holmes attended Gordon College in Wenham, Massachusetts, where he graduated with a degree in English and Communications in 2001. During this time, he played in a punk rock band and participated in an improvisational comedy troupe called The Sweaty-Toothed Madmen. 

Partly at the behest of his mother, he had plans to become a youth pastor. This gave way to public speaking, and his love for comedy and his devolving faith in God eventually won over his need to preach; he now refers to himself as "Christ-leaning" or jokingly a "hooraytheist". Finding little success as a comedian in his home state, he lived in Sleepy Hollow, New York, before moving to Chicago and then Los Angeles.

Career

2001–2009: Early career 
Holmes career began in the New York City comedy scene. In the mid-2000s, he was making club appearances and took part in Comedy Central's Premium Blend, as a regular panelist on VH1's Best Week Ever, and on VH1's All Access. He began working as a touring comic, including on the Christian comedy circuit. Since 2006, his cartoons have appeared in The New Yorker. 

Holmes also created and appeared in a Super Bowl XLIII ad for Doritos in 2009 featuring a fictional new flavor of the product, beer, in which each chip contains as much alcohol as a 16 o.z. can of beer.

2010–2013: Breakthrough

Stand-up and You Made It Weird with Pete Holmes 
In 2010, he performed on John Oliver's New York Stand Up Show as well as Late Night with Jimmy Fallon. On February 26, 2010, he performed his first television special on the series Comedy Central Presents. On March 21, 2011, and on November 17, 2011, he appeared on the TBS talk show Conan.

Holmes released his first album, Impregnated With Wonder, on iTunes on November 15, 2011. In 2013, he released his second album, Nice Try, The Devil.

In 2011, Holmes launched his long-form comedy podcast You Made It Weird with Pete Holmes. It has featured guests such as Garry Shandling, Judd Apatow, Aziz Ansari, John Mulaney, Ben Schwartz, and Dana Carvey. Topics typically discussed in each episode are the guests' views on comedy, sexuality, and religion.

Television and The Pete Holmes Show 
Holmes has provided the voices for several of the characters on Comedy Central's cartoon Ugly Americans. He was the voice of the E-Trade baby on several television commercials and was credited as a writer for those commercials.

He wrote for the NBC primetime sitcom Outsourced and for the Fox sitcom I Hate My Teenage Daughter prior to its cancellation in May 2012.

Holmes has created a comedic portrayal of Batman in CollegeHumor's internet series Badman. He ran a YouTube channel which was focused around skits alongside Matthew McCarthy called frontpagefilms.

On August 21 and 23 in 2012, Holmes recorded three episodes of a talk show pilot for TBS, produced by Conan O'Brien, entitled The Midnight Show with Pete Holmes. Holmes's guests on the unaired pilots included Nick Offerman, Joel McHale, T. J. Miller, and Bill Burr. On February 26, 2013, TBS picked up the show and began airing in late 2013. By July 10, 2013, the name of the show was The Pete Holmes Show. The series premiered on October 28, after Conan.

The show was picked up for a second season by TBS. On December 9, 2013, Gabe Liedman performed the show's first stand-up routine. On May 23, 2014, TBS canceled the talk show after two seasons following poor audience ratings. The show ended its run on June 19, 2014.

2014–present: Crashing and new projects 

Holmes released his third comedy special, Faces and Sounds, in 2016. In 2019, he released his fourth album, Dirty Clean.

Holmes created and stars in the HBO series Crashing. Crashing is a semi-autobiographical show on HBO that revolves around Holmes' character Pete, a young comedian who pursues a career in stand-up comedy after his wife cheats on him, leaving him homeless. Holmes successfully pitched the idea of the show to Judd Apatow and it was picked up by HBO for filming in September 2015, with Apatow as director. The success of the pilot led HBO to give the green-light to the first season in January 2016. After four episodes had aired, HBO renewed the series for a second season which premiered on January 14, 2018. On February 21, 2018, HBO renewed the series for a third season. Although season three was praised by critics, HBO canceled Crashing in March 2019.

On May 14, 2019, Holmes released his book Comedy Sex God, which is described as, "part autobiography, part philosophical inquiry, and part spiritual quest."

On March 29, 2021, Holmes was selected to play the lead role of a laid-off auto worker-turned-professional bowler (based on the life of Tom Smallwood) in a CBS sitcom pilot.  On May 14, 2021, the pilot for Smallwood was ordered to series, with a mid-season debut planned for the 2021–22 television season. On November 24, CBS announced the sitcom has been retitled How We Roll, and received an adjusted first-season order of 11 episodes. On December 10, 2021, CBS announced the series would premiere on March 31, 2022. On May 12, 2022, CBS announced the show had been canceled after one season.

Influences 
Holmes has listed Weird Al, Brian Regan, Sinbad, Steve Martin, Gallagher, Jackie Martling, Conan O'Brien, Jerry Seinfeld, Chris Farley, Dane Cook, and Ray Romano as his biggest comedic influences.

Personal life 
Holmes first married when he was 22 years old; he divorced when he was 28. In late 2017, he married Valerie Chaney. Their daughter was born in September 2018.

Holmes is a vegan.

Works

Comedy specials 

 Impregnated with Wonder (2011)
 Nice Try, The Devil (2013)
 Faces and Sounds (2016)
 Dirty Clean (2018)

Film

Television

References

External links
 
 
 

1979 births
21st-century American male actors
21st-century American comedians
American comedy writers
American male comedians
American male television actors
American male television writers
American male voice actors
American people of Lithuanian descent
American podcasters
American sketch comedians
American stand-up comedians
American television talk show hosts
American television writers
Comedians from Massachusetts
Gordon College (Massachusetts) alumni
Late night television talk show hosts
Lexington High School alumni
Living people
People from Lexington, Massachusetts
Screenwriters from Massachusetts
21st-century American screenwriters
21st-century American male writers